There are many places and institutions named for Benjamin Franklin, one of the Founding Fathers of the United States. These include counties, municipalities (that is, towns and cities), geologic features, colleges and universities, high schools, middle schools, elementary schools, businesses, transportation ways, and a proposed U.S. state.

Territories
State of Franklin, a defunct state located in what is now northeastern Tennessee near present-day Elizabethton, Tennessee.

Counties

24 Counties and Parishes in the United States are named for Benjamin Franklin.

 Franklin County, Alabama
 Franklin County, Arkansas
 Franklin County, Florida
 Franklin County, Georgia
 Franklin County, Illinois
 Franklin County, Indiana
 Franklin County, Iowa
 Franklin County, Kansas
 Franklin County, Kentucky
 Franklin Parish, Louisiana
 Franklin County, Maine
 Franklin County, Massachusetts
 Franklin County, Mississippi
 Franklin County, Missouri
 Franklin County, Nebraska
 Franklin County, New York
 Franklin County, North Carolina
 Franklin County, Ohio
 Franklin County, Pennsylvania
 Franklin County, Tennessee
 Franklin County, Vermont
 Franklin County, Virginia
 Franklin County, Washington

Municipalities

Geologic features 

 Mount Franklin, in New Hampshire's White Mountains
 Franklin Mountains, El Paso, Texas
 Franklin Mountains, northern Alaska
 Benjamin Franklin Lake, Mt Juliet, Tennessee

Schools

Colleges and universities 

Franklin College, Lancaster, Pennsylvania, established 1787; now Franklin and Marshall College
Franklin College, in Franklin, Indiana
 Franklin College, a residential college at Yale University
Franklin College of Arts and Sciences at the University of Georgia (in its earliest days, before the university contained multiple colleges, the entire institution was referred to as Franklin)
Franklin University, in Columbus, Ohio
Campus Benjamin Franklin, a part of the Charité, Berlin, Germany
Benjamin Franklin Institute of Technology in Boston, Massachusetts
Franklin University Switzerland in Lugano, Switzerland

Elementary, middle, and high schools

High schools

 Franklin High School (Elk Grove, California)
 Franklin High School (Los Angeles, California)
 Franklin High School (Stockton, California)
 Franklin County High School, (Rocky Mount, VA)
 Franklin Central High School, (Indianapolis, Indiana)
 Franklin Senior High School, (Franklin, Louisiana)
 Benjamin Franklin High School (New Orleans, Louisiana)
 Franklin High School (Reisterstown, Maryland)
 Franklin High School (Massachusetts)
 Franklin High School (Livonia, Michigan)
 Franklin High School (New Hampshire)
 Franklin High School (New Jersey)
 Benjamin Franklin High School (Rochester, New York)
 Felicity-Franklin High School (Felicity, Ohio)
 Franklin High School (Franklin, Ohio)
 Franklin High School (Portland, Oregon)
 Benjamin Franklin High School (Philadelphia, Pennsylvania)
 Franklin Learning Center, (Philadelphia, Pennsylvania)
 Franklin Towne Charter High School, (Philadelphia, Pennsylvania)
 Franklin High School (Tennessee)
 Franklin High School (El Paso, Texas)
 Franklin High School (Virginia)
 Franklin High School (Seattle, Washington)
 Franklin High School (Franklin, Wisconsin)
  Benjamin Franklin High School(Queen Creek, Arizona)

Middle schools
 Benjamin Franklin Middle School, Vallejo, California
 Benjamin Franklin Middle School, Valparaiso, Indiana
 Benjamin Franklin Middle School, Ridgewood, New Jersey
 Benjamin Franklin Middle School, Teaneck, New Jersey
 Benjamin Franklin Middle School, Tonawanda, New York
 Benjamin Franklin Middle School, Fargo, North Dakota
 Benjamin Franklin Middle School, Rocky Mount, Virginia – see also Franklin County High School (Rocky Mount, Virginia) (above)
 Franklin Middle School, Reisterstown, Maryland – see also Franklin High School (Reisterstown, Maryland) (above)
 Franklin Middle School, (Cedar Rapids, Iowa)
 Franklin Middle School, Janesville, Wisconsin
 Franklin Middle School, Fairfax County, Virginia

Elementary schools
• Franklin Elementary School, Franklin, Connecticut 
 Franklin Elementary School, Janesville, Wisconsin
Benjamin Franklin Elementary School, Glendale, California
 Benjamin Franklin Middle School, Rocky Mount, Virginia
 Benjamin Franklin Elementary School, Miami, Florida
 Benjamin Franklin Elementary School Terre Haute, Indiana
 Franklin Elementary School, Reisterstown, Maryland – see also Franklin High School (Reisterstown, Maryland) (above)
 Franklin Elementary, Rochester, Minnesota
 Franklin Elementary School, Roxbury, New Jersey
 Benjamin Franklin Elementary School, Keene, New Hampshire
 Benjamin Franklin Elementary School, Menomonee Falls, Wisconsin
 Benjamin Franklin Elementary School, Lawrenceville, New Jersey
 Franklin Elementary School, Summit, New Jersey
 Benjamin Franklin Elementary School, Binghamton, New York

 Benjamin Franklin Elementary School, Yorktown Heights, New York
 Benjamin Franklin Elementary School, Grand Forks, North Dakota
 Benjamin Franklin Elementary School, Philadelphia, Pennsylvania
 Benjamin Franklin International School Barcelona
 Ben Franklin Kindergarten Center, Dupont, Pennsylvania
 Benjamin Franklin Elementary School, Kirkland, Washington
 Franklin Elementary School, Wausau, Wisconsin

Businesses 

Ben Franklin five and dime stores
Franklin Mills Mall (now Philadelphia Mills Mall)
Franklin Templeton Investments
Benjamin Franklin Plumbing
FranklinCovey's corporate campus in Salt Lake City

Transportation
Benjamin Franklin Bridge, Philadelphia, Pennsylvania
Franklin Street, Philadelphia, Pennsylvania
Benjamin Franklin Parkway, Philadelphia, Pennsylvania
U.S. Route 422 in Pennsylvania is named the Benjamin Franklin Highway 
Franklin Street, Baltimore, Maryland
Franklin Street, Boston, Massachusetts
Franklin Street, Chapel Hill, North Carolina
Franklin Street, Portland, Maine
Franklin Street, Richmond, Virginia

Other

Benjamin Franklin Centre, the student centre at the Chinese University of Hong Kong
The Franklin crater on the Moon
Franklin Field, the football stadium at the University of Pennsylvania, Philadelphia
 The Franklin Inn Club, one of the four historic gentlemen's clubs in Philadelphia's Center City and was the first to open membership to women in Philadelphia.
Franklin Institute, a major science museum in Philadelphia, which includes a Planetarium
Franklin Park, Boston
Franklin Park Zoo
Franklin Park Conservatory
First Battle of Franklin, an American Civil War battle
Second Battle of Franklin, an American Civil War battle
Several ships named USS Franklin

See also
Franklin (disambiguation)

References

Lists of places named after people
Lists of places in the United States
Lists of things named after politicians